is an onsen in the city of Ninohe, Iwate Prefecture, in the Tōhoku region of northern Japan.

The onsen consists of seven establishments on the banks of the Mabechi River, and was developed from 1626 in the early Edo period for samurai in the service of the Nanbu clan of Morioka Domain.  
The alkaline spa was named a National Public Health Spa by the Ministry of the Environment in April 1994, and claims to be effective for neuralgia, back pain, hypertension, and rheumatism.

The Ryokufūsō establishment in Kindaichi was famed throughout Japan for being the home of a zashiki-warashi, but it burned to the ground in a fire on October 4, 2009.

References

External links
 

Hot springs of Iwate Prefecture
Tourist attractions in Iwate Prefecture
Landforms of Iwate Prefecture
Ninohe, Iwate